The 2021 Lewis Flyers men's volleyball team represents Lewis University in the 2021 NCAA Division I & II men's volleyball season. The Flyers, led by seventeenth year head coach Dan Friend, play their home games at Neil Carey Arena. The Flyers are members of the Midwestern Intercollegiate Volleyball Association and were picked to win the MIVA in the preseason poll.

Season highlights
Will be filled in as the season progresses.

Roster

Schedule
TV/Internet Streaming information:
All home games will be televised on GLVC SN. All road games will also be streamed on the oppositions streaming service. The NCAA Tournament will be streamed on B1G+ (opening round, quarterfinals), NCAA.com (semifinals), and the Championship will be televised nationally on ESPNU.

 *-Indicates conference match.
 Times listed are Central Time Zone.

Announcers for televised games
Campbellsville (KY): No commentary
Queens: Matt Mohan & Reid Pohland
Lincoln Memorial: Matt Mohan & Patrick Hennessey
St. Francis: Jake Slebodnick
NJIT: No commentary
Ohio State: No commentary
Ohio State: No commentary
Purdue Fort Wayne: Matt Mohan & Cody Lindeman
Purdue Fort Wayne: Patrick Hennessey & Matt Mohan
McKendree: Matt Mohan & Cody Lindeman
Ball State: Matt Mohan & Patrick Hennessey
Ball State: Matt Mohan & Cody Lindeman
McKendree: Colin Suhre
Lindenwood: No commentary
Lindenwood: No commentary
Quincy: Matt Mohan & Patrick Hennessey
Quincy: Matt Mohan & Cody Lindeman
Loyola (Chicago): Jason Goch & Ray Gooden
Loyola (Chicago): Jason Goch & Ray Gooden
Quincy: Matt Mohan & Patrick Hennessey
Ball State: Patrick Hennessey & Cody Lindeman
Loyola (Chicago): Patrick Hennessey & Cody Lindeman
Penn State: Luke Wood Maloney & Ben Spurlock
BYU: Paul Sunderland & Kevin Barnett

References

2021 in sports in Illinois
2021 NCAA Division I & II men's volleyball season
2021 Eastern Intercollegiate Volleyball Association season